Interstate 391 (I-391) is an auxiliary Interstate Highway located entirely within the US state of Massachusetts.

Route description

I-391 begins at an interchange with I-91 (at exit 9) in southern Chicopee, just north of the Atwater Park and the Calvary Cemetery. Initially running parallel to the Connecticut River, it intersects with Route 116 in Chicopee center and crosses the Chicopee River. I-391 then has another junction with Route 116 in the Sandy Hill section of town, and, in less than one mile (1.6 km), it crosses underneath the Massachusetts Turnpike without an interchange. I-391 continues north through the rest of northern Chicopee, intersecting Route 141 along the way and then passing just east of Rivers Park. I-391 then crosses the Connecticut River into the city of Holyoke, where it has two closely spaced exits for local streets in the town. I-391 officially comes to an end at High Street in Holyoke, with the road continuing as Resnic Boulevard, which connects to US 202 after .

History

Plans for the highway originated from the Master Highway Plan for the Springfield metropolitan area in 1953, which planned for a "major street improvement" to Route 116. By the 1960s, freeway access was needed between Chicopee and Holyoke to improve traffic flow which prompted a spur route of I-91 to be built. I-391's planned six lanes were built to handle up to 50,000 vehicles every day, and the total cost of the proposed highway was estimated at about $35 million (equivalent to $ in ). In 1965, an alignment of the highway had been set, along with two alternative alignments. Construction for I-391 began in 1967 with a short  highway, which was completed in 1970. After years of no progress, construction started again in 1978. The highway was completed in 1982 after about 15 years of planning and construction.

An interchange with the Massachusetts Turnpike (I-90) was part of the original proposal, as it would have connected the turnpike to Chicopee and Holyoke, though it was never built.

Exit list
All exit numbers in Massachusetts were to eventually be renumbered to mileage-based numbers under a future project, but that project was postponed. On November 18, 2019, the Massachusetts Department of Transportation  announced that I-391's exit numbers would not be changed because its exits were so tightly spaced.

References

Further reading

External links

 I-391 Historical Overview from bostonroads.com
 Mass. I-391 Current and Future Exit Numbers List

91-3
91-3
3
Transportation in Hampden County, Massachusetts